King Thrushbeard is a German fairy tale collected by the Brothers Grimm (KHM 52). It is of Aarne–Thompson type 900.

Origin 
The tale was published by the Brothers Grimm in the first edition of Kinder- und Hausmärchen in 1812, and slightly modified in the second edition issued in 1819. Their sources were the Hassenpflug family from Hanau, supplemented by Ludowine Haxthausen and by Wilhelm Grimm's friend and future wife, Dortchen Wild.

Synopsis
A beautiful, but spoiled and shallow princess rudely criticizes all her suitors because she is too proud. She is impressed with the last one, but her pride will not let her accept him. He is a young king with such a thick pointed beard, that to her it looks like a thrush's beak, so she cruelly dubs him King Thrushbeard. He leaves in anger. Her father, exasperated and angry at how she scorned them all, vows that the first man who comes to the palace the next day, whether he be a noble or a peasant, will become her husband. Meanwhile, an unknown stranger overhears the conversation.

When a young minstrel with a clean shaven face appears in the palace the next day, the king offers his daughter's hand in marriage. He disapproves of marrying her immediately as she does not look strong nor does she appear to be capable of any practical work. However, he notes the poor cannot be choosy and agrees to marry her. She opposes vehemently because he is a commoner, but the king has given his word. She marries him and he takes her away from the palace to his home.

As they travel to the minstrel's home, they pass by the fine lands and properties that belong to King Thrushbeard, and the princess begins to regret scorning him. They arrive at his home, a house fit only for swine. He treats her as though she was a commoner and she is upset now that she must work for a living. He has her doing practical chores such as cleaning the house, weaving baskets, and spinning cotton, at which she is completely inept. She is then sent to sell pottery in the marketplace and all seems to go well, until a drunken soldier on a horse passes by and smashes every single pot to pieces. Thoroughly annoyed at her constant failures, the minstrel tells her the only job left for her is to work as a servant at the nearby castle of a young king: King Thrushbeard.

The princess is initially ashamed that she must work in the palace of a suitor she so harshly scorned and deeply regrets doing so, but puts her pride aside when she realizes that her husband is depending on her to help out with the household. Eventually, she swallows the last of her pride and becomes so compassionate that she throws scraps of food to the mice who live in their home because she realizes they are hungry too.

Just as her life is going smoothly, the princess discovers one day that King Thrushbeard is getting married. She is forced into the great hall by him for a dance. It causes her pockets containing scraps of food to burst open, which spill all over the floor and everybody laughs. She is so embarrassed that she flees the hall crying.

However, much to the princess' surprise, someone follows and catches up with her. Dressed in finery is the minstrel, who smiles and asks why she is crying on her wedding day. She is shocked to discover he is really King Thrushbeard. He fell in love with her despite her scorn and secretly married her through her father's vow. Her ordeals (including his disguise as a drunken soldier) were meant to cure her of her proud, spoiled ways and punishment for her cruelty towards him. She is ashamed of herself and thanks him for teaching her to be compassionate to others. They marry with her father at the wedding. She asks before the whole court that he grow his beard back. He, from then on, is known by no other name but King Thrushbeard and they all live happily ever after.

Cultural legacy
 The story was filmed as König Drosselbart (1954), directed by Herbert B. Fredersdorf.
 The story was adapted in 1969 as the Soviet cartoon The Capricious Princess (Капризная принцесса).
 The tale is retold in an episode of Grimm's Fairy Tale Classics under the title King Grizzlebeard. In this version, the princess' name is Elena. In addition, her father decrees that Elena will be married to the man with the lowest standing who comes to the castle the next day.
 It appeared as a storybook and cassette as part of the Once Upon a Time fairy tale series under the title King Rough-Beard.
 A version is told in the book Servant of the Dragon by David Drake.
 A version of the story also appears as a pilot episode of the cartoon series Simsala Grimm. In this version, the princess' name is Constance, while King Thrushbeard's name is Conrad. In addition, Constance's father decrees that she will be married to the next minstrel who comes to the castle.
 In the comic book series Fables by Bill Willingham, Thrushbeard is a fable that resides at Fabletown and first appears in Fables Vol 4.

See also

 William Shakespeare's The Taming of the Shrew

References

External links

 
 King Thrushbeard and variants

Grimms' Fairy Tales
Thrushbeard
Male characters in fairy tales
ATU 850-999